Nataliya Grygoryeva may refer to
Nataliya Grygoryeva (hurdler) (born 1962), Ukrainian hurdle runner
Nataliya Grigoryeva (rower) (born 1965), Russian rower